Reiner Hollmann (born 30 September 1949) is a German former football player and  now manager.

Footballer
Before coming to Duisburg, Hollmann was in the youth section of Eintracht Duisburg. He played from 1970 to 1984 for Rot-Weiß Oberhausen and Eintracht Braunschweig in 350 games in the Bundesliga scoring 33 goals.

He took part in the 1972 Summer Olympics in Munich.

Coach
After his playing career, Hollmann worked as football coach. His greatest success as a coach was winning the  Turkish Super Cup and the Turkish League with Galatasaray for the 1993–94 season. Further coaching positions were, amongst other clubs, 1. FC Saarbrücken, FC Carl Zeiss Jena and Al Ahly Cairo.

For several years he has been in the United Arab Emirates where he worked with  Al Nasr, Al Shabab (Dubai) and Al-Wahda FC (Abu Dhabi).

Trivia
In 1977, Hollmann was playing for Bundesliga side Eintracht Braunschweig against 1. FC Kaiserslautern. When protesting against a penalty kick he thought it was not justified, the referee unintentionally knocked him unconscious, and Hollmann woke up in the ambulance.

References

1949 births
Living people
Footballers from Duisburg
German footballers
Association football defenders
Rot-Weiß Oberhausen players
Eintracht Braunschweig players
Bundesliga players
2. Bundesliga players
Germany B international footballers
Footballers at the 1972 Summer Olympics
Olympic footballers of West Germany
West German footballers
German football managers
FC Carl Zeiss Jena managers
Galatasaray S.K. (football) managers
1. FC Saarbrücken managers
Al Ahly SC managers
Al Hilal SFC managers
Al-Nasr SC (Dubai) managers
Kuwait SC managers
Al-Shaab CSC managers
Al Shabab Al Arabi Club managers
Al Wahda FC managers
Al-Wakrah SC managers
Zamalek SC managers
2. Bundesliga managers
Süper Lig managers
Egyptian Premier League managers
Saudi Professional League managers
UAE Pro League managers
Kuwait Premier League managers
Qatar Stars League managers
German expatriate football managers
German expatriate sportspeople in Turkey
German expatriate sportspeople in Egypt
German expatriate sportspeople in Saudi Arabia
German expatriate sportspeople in the United Arab Emirates
German expatriate sportspeople in Kuwait
German expatriate sportspeople in Qatar
Expatriate football managers in Turkey
Expatriate football managers in Egypt
Expatriate football managers in Saudi Arabia
Expatriate football managers in the United Arab Emirates
Expatriate football managers in Kuwait
Expatriate football managers in Qatar